The European Crusaders are an international Australian Rules Football team composed of European citizens.  Although Team Europe operates with a similar concept, the Crusaders were notably the first female all European team to compete in Australia for the Australian Football International Cup. The team was also the first female combined team to play in the International Cup with players originating from Croatia, Denmark, England, France, Germany, Italy, Norway, Sweden, Northern Ireland  and Scotland. A male European Crusaders team was originally formed but disbanded prior to the tournament.

2017 AFL International Cup 
In 2017 the European Crusaders formed and competed in the International AFL Women's Competition. Meeting only a few days before the beginning of the tournament, the Crusaders became known for "their spirit, determination and improvement" as it progressed. They trained at Princes Park, South Melbourne. The majority of the team and staff are French women competing in the French Australian Football League, with a number of Paris Cockerels.

2017 Squad Members

References 

Australian rules football clubs in Europe